Bertholdia semiumbrata is a moth of the family Erebidae. It was described by Adalbert Seitz in 1921. It is found in Costa Rica.

References

Phaegopterina
Moths described in 1921